"Be There for Me Baby" is a song written by Tommy Rocco and Charlie Black, and recorded by American country music artist Johnny Lee.  It was released in January 1982 as the second single from the album Bet Your Heart on Me.  The song reached number 10 on the Billboard Hot Country Singles & Tracks chart.

Chart performance

References

1982 singles
1981 songs
Johnny Lee (singer) songs
Song recordings produced by Jim Ed Norman
Asylum Records singles
Songs written by Charlie Black
Songs written by Tommy Rocco